Michael L. Dourson is an American toxicologist and Director of Science at the nonprofit organization, Toxicology Excellence for Risk Assessment.  He was formerly a senior advisor to the Administrator of EPA, and prior to that, a professor at the Risk Science Center at the University of Cincinnati College of Medicine. Prior to joining the University of Cincinnati, he was founder and president of the nonprofit Toxicology Excellence for Risk Assessment. Earlier in his career, he was employed by the Environmental Protection Agency Environmental Criteria and Assessment Office, among other assignments.

In July 2017, Dourson was nominated by President Donald Trump to become Assistant Administrator of the Environmental Protection Agency, Office of Chemical Safety and Pollution Prevention. The United States Senate Committee on Environment and Public Works voted to advance his nomination on October 25, 2017. Dourson withdrew his nomination on December 13, 2017.

Career
Dourson is board-certified by the American Board of Toxicology and a fellow of the Academy of Toxicological Sciences and the Society for Risk Analysis. He joined the Environmental Protection Agency after earning his doctorate in toxicology at the University of Cincinnati College of Medicine. During his time at the EPA, Dourson was one of the founders of the agency's Integrated Risk Information System (IRIS), a program that identifies and characterizes the health hazards of chemicals in the environment. Dourson was awarded a total of four bronze medals for his work on IRIS, ambient water criteria, sewage sludge rulemaking, and developing risk methodology during his 15-year tenure with the agency. He also served as a member of EPA's Science Advisory Board for six years.

Dourson worked in various roles in Cincinnati, Chicago, and Washington D.C. before founding the nonprofit Toxicology Excellence for Risk Assessment (TERA) in 1995. TERA determines the risk profile of chemicals, and maintained the International Toxicity Estimates for Risk (ITER) database until TERA was invited by the University of Cincinnati in 2015 to join as a separate center within the Department of Environmental Health. The National Institutes of Health (NIH) Toxicology Data Network (TOXNET) includes ITER in its list of reference databases for public use. The nonprofit has accepted payments for criticizing studies that raised concerns about the safety of its clients' products. Although TERA has collaborated with industry sponsors, the organization's annual reports indicate that TERA collaborates with government sponsors twice as often---over 70 government organizations during its history.

Dourson was awarded the Arnold J. Lehman award from the Society of Toxicology and the International Achievement Award by the International Society of Regulatory Toxicology and Pharmacology. He is a fellow of the Academy of Toxicological Sciences and the Society for Risk Analysis.

Dourson is also a writer of a series of books entitled Evidence of Faith which examine the intersection of evolution and Bible history.

Toxicology debates
Dourson's organization TERA has studied many substances whose use has been the matter of public debate, including chlorpyrifos (a pesticide), diacetyl (a food additive), ammonium perchlorate (a rocket fuel), 1-bromopropane (an industrial solvent), and perfluorooctanoic acid (PFOA) (a plastics production chemical). The determinations of safe occupational exposure limits, safe water standards, threshold limit value, recommended exposure limit and safe dose may vary by a factor of ten, even among equally qualified investigators.

In his 2017 confirmation hearings, Dourson was grilled about safe levels of PFOA in drinking water. The attack came amid the filing of 3,500 lawsuits over PFOA exposure.  In 2002, Dourson and two other TERA scientists had participated in a court-ordered ten-person panel to review existing research on PFOA. Five members of the panel were government representatives and two from DuPont.  The panel found no history of illness or premature death in 3M or DuPont manufacturing workers since 1947. It did find a heightened liver disease risk in animal models among other lesser risks. The panel recommended a reduction in the allowable amount in drinking water to 150 ppb, a reduction from a DuPont-sponsored recommendation of 210 ppb. The concentration of PFOA in the Lubeck, West Virginia public water supply was at that time 1 ppb.

In 2018, Dourson filed comments urging a "less stringent level" for PFOA and PFOS in response to a federal study.

Failed nomination to EPA
In July 2017, President Donald Trump nominated Dourson to become Assistant Administrator of the Environmental Protection Agency, Chemical Safety and Pollution Prevention. His nomination was sent to the United States Senate on July 19, 2017. His hearing before the United States Senate Committee on Environment and Public Works took place on October 4, 2017. During the hearing, he was criticized by Democrats for his ties to the chemical industry. Dourson defended himself to the satisfaction of the committee, saying he would commit to the law and the EPA's mission to protect the public and the environment from chemicals. Dourson's nomination was endorsed by the American Chemistry Council. An October 2017 New York Times editorial called Dourson a "scientist for hire" and said his nomination for an EPA post was "dangerous to public health." During his Senate confirmation process, he responded privately in writing to accusations and these responses were sent to several US Senators.  These responses have been made public.  For a copy, see: https://www.tera.org/about/TERAcollaborativework%2012.8.17.pdf.

Dourson withdrew his nomination on December 13, 2017.

His nomination for Assistant Administrator of the Environmental Protection Agency was not formally withdrawn by President Trump but was instead returned unconfirmed to the President by the U.S. Senate on January 3, 2018, under Standing Rules of the United States Senate, Rule XXXI, paragraph 6.

References

External links
 Biography at Toxicology Excellence for Risk Assessment

Year of birth missing (living people)
Living people
Wittenberg University alumni
University of Cincinnati College of Medicine alumni
American toxicologists
University of Cincinnati faculty